The House in Dormer Forest is a 1920 romance novel by the British writer Mary Webb. It was part of a wave of regional novels set across Britain, in Webb's case in her native Shropshire. She wrote it while living at her home near Bayston Hill. It was one of several works that inspired the later parody novel Cold Comfort Farm by Stella Gibbons.

Synopsis
The plot follows the lives of the Darke family, now headed by Solomon Darke, who have lived in the now crumbling Dormer House since the Elizabethan Era.

References

Bibliography
 Baldick, Chris. Literature of the 1920s: Writers Among the Ruins, Volume 3. Edinburgh University Press, 2015.
 Radford, Andrew. The Lost Girls: Demeter-Persephone and the Literary Imagination, 1850-1930. BRILL, 2007.
 Stringer, Jenny & Sutherland, John. The Oxford Companion to Twentieth-century Literature in English. Oxford University Press, 1996.

1920 British novels
Novels by Mary Webb
British romance novels
Hutchinson (publisher) books
Novels set in Shropshire